Worley is an unincorporated community and coal town in McCreary County, Kentucky, United States. Its post office closed in 1953.

References

Unincorporated communities in McCreary County, Kentucky
Unincorporated communities in Kentucky
Coal towns in Kentucky